Silver Sands F.C. is a football club, based in the parish of Christ Church, Barbados. They play in the Barbados Premier Division, the top tier of football in Barbados.

References

Football clubs in Barbados